Qiu Li Gao or Autumn Pear Syrup or Sydney Paste is a pear syrup or paste used as a traditional medicine in East Asia, in particular in Chinese food therapy.

History 

Preparation 
The preparation is made at home and in factories. Commercial products are sold in 12-ounce bottles. 

Ingredients include autumn-harvested asian pears, monk fruit, and honey. Sometimes other ingredients such as ginger, jujube, and fritillaria bulbs are included.

Uses 
The preparation is used to suppress coughing and mucus production and to treat asthma and dry cough. Traditional practitioners believe it "nourishes lung yin and promotes the production of body fluid".

See also 

 Pear-syrup candy
 Traditional Chinese medicine

References 

Traditional Chinese medicine